The Cypress-Fairbanks Independent School District (CFISD, often referred to as Cy-Fair) is an independent school district with its headquarters in northwest unincorporated Harris County, Texas, United States. Cy-Fair ISD is the largest  Recognized school district in the state of Texas with 75 out of 78 campuses receiving an 'Exemplary' or 'Recognized' rating by the Texas Education Agency in 2010.

The district covers a small portion of Houston (including the Fairbanks section), the city of Jersey Village, and other unincorporated areas in Harris County (including Cypress).

Cypress-Fairbanks ISD is part of the taxation base for Lone Star College System (formerly North Harris Montgomery Community College District).

As of August 2020, the district had 92 general-purpose campuses (fifty-six elementary schools, nineteen middle schools, thirteen high schools, and four special program facilities).

History
The first official classes in the area were held in a church. However, in 1884, local residents built a one-room house on donated land. In 1939, an election was held in which voters in the Cypress and Fairbanks school systems approved the creation of the Cypress-Fairbanks Consolidated School District; the measure passed by a vote of 129-66 in Cypress and 90-87 in Fairbanks.

The two individuals most frequently credited for the creation of Cypress-Fairbanks Consolidated School District (CSD was changed to ISD in the early 1960s) were Trustee J. F. Bane, of the Fairbanks school system, and Superintendent E. A. Millsap (1932-1942), of the Cypress school system.

Since 2006, Children at Risk, a non-profit organization based in Houston, publishes its "Annual School Rankings" which ranks Houston metropolitan area schools using a formula going beyond the state’s school accountability system, using traditional indicators such as whether students passed state exams,  drop-out and graduation rates along with less commonly used indicators such as counseling and poverty intervention. In 2012, Children at Risk evaluated and ranked 150 high schools in the greater Houston area and 8 CyFair-ISD high schools (out of a total of 10)  appeared in the rankings. Additionally, Cypress Ridge High School ranked fifth among Greater Houston’s Best Urban, Comprehensive High Schools.

During the wake of the Uvalde school shooting in 2022, Texan schools were all told to assess security measures for the protection of students, teachers, and staff in schools. In response to this, CFISD did so by adding bullet resistant glass, man traps, lock-down buttons, intruder locks for classroom doors, walls to schools that were previously open-concept, and signs that remind people to not leave their doors open for many of their schools.

In 2022 the district began requiring parental permission for students to check books out of school libraries.

Statistics
By the 2006-2007 school year, the district was the third largest in Texas with more than 70 campuses and 100,603 students.

In the 2010-2011 school year the district had over 106,000 students. Of them, 42.5% were Hispanic, 31% were White, 15.5% were Black, 8% were Asian, and others included Native Americans and people of two or more races.

In the 2017-2018 school year, district enrollment reached 116,138 students.

Transportation
In 2009, in the midst of budget deficits caused by decreased state funding, the board voted to only have school bus services for a resident who lives more than two miles from his or her school, as opposed to having service for residents living more than one mile away. Activity (late) bus service was also discontinued for most CFISD schools. Bus service continued and was expanded to accommodate student mothers, delivering mothers and their children to schools and district funded daycares on campus. If a student has to cross a major street then bus service is available even if the student lives within 2 miles of the school. Starting in the beginning of 2013-2014 school year, activity (late) bus service are back for most CFISD schools and in the 2014 CFISD Bond, the board voted to bring back school bus services for residents living more than one mile away starting in the 2014-2015 school year.

Schools

High schools

There are 12 high schools in unincorporated Harris County and one in Jersey Village, a total of 13 high schools in the district.
Cy-Fair High School (opened 1940)
Jersey Village High School (opened 1972)
Cypress Creek High School ( opened 1977)
Langham Creek High School (opened 1984)
Cypress Falls High School (opened 1992)
Cypress Springs High School (opened 1997)
Cypress Ridge High School (opened 2002)
Cypress Woods High School (opened 2006)
Cypress Ranch High School (opened 2008)
Cypress Lakes High School (opened 2008)
Cypress Park High School (opened 2016)
Bridgeland High School (opened 2017)

Middle schools

Anthony Middle School 
Aragon Middle School 
Arnold Middle School 
National Blue Ribbon School in 1990-91 and 1997-98 
Bleyl Middle School 
National Blue Ribbon School in 1983-84 and 1990-91 
Campbell Middle School 
Cook Middle School 
Dean Middle School  (Houston)
Goodson Middle School 
Hamilton Middle School 
Hopper Middle School 
Kahla Middle School 
Labay Middle School 
National Blue Ribbon School in 1988-89, 1992–93, and 1997–98 
Rowe Middle School 
Salyards Middle School 
Smith Middle School 
Spillane Middle School 
Thornton Middle School 
National Blue Ribbon School in 1999-2000 
Truitt Middle School 
Watkins Middle School 
National Blue Ribbon School in 2001-02

Elementary schools

Adam Elementary School
André Elementary School
Ault Elementary School
Bane Elementary School (Houston)
Bang Elementary School 
Birkes Elementary School
Black Elementary School
Copeland Elementary School
Danish Elementary School
Duryea Elementary School
Emery Elementary School
Emmott Elementary School
Farney Elementary School
Fiest Elementary School
National Blue Ribbon School in 1993-94 
Francone Elementary School
National Blue Ribbon School in 1991-92 
Frazier Elementary School
Gleason Elementary School
Hairgrove Elementary School
Hamilton Elementary School
Hancock Elementary School
Hemmenway Elementary School
Holbrook Elementary School (Houston)
Holmsley Elementary School
Hoover Elementary School
Horne Elementary School
Jowell Elementary School
Keith Elementary School
Kirk Elementary School
Lamkin Elementary School
Lee Elementary School
Lieder Elementary School
Lowery Elementary School
National Blue Ribbon School in 1991-92 
Matzke Elementary School
McFee Elementary School
Mcgowen Elementary School
Metcalf Elementary School
Millsap Elementary School
Moore Elementary School
Owens Elementary School
National Blue Ribbon School in 1998-99 
Pope Elementary School
Post Elementary School (Jersey Village)
Postma Elementary School
Reed Elementary School
Rennell Elementary School
A. Robison Elementary School
M. Robinson Elementary School
Sampson Elementary School
Sheridan Elementary School
Swenke Elementary School
Tipps Elementary School
Walker Elementary School
Warner Elementary School
Wells Elementary School
Willbern Elementary School
Wilson Elementary School
Woodard Elementary School
Yeager Elementary School

Other Facilities

The district headquarters, the  Instructional Support Center (ISC), is a former shopping center that was previously owned by the Federal Deposit Insurance Corporation (FDIC). The district purchased it for $1.4 million, with the previous tenants being a part of the CFISD agreement to purchase the building. After the purchase, CFISD renovated  of the facility. The district had spent $9 million to build its previous headquarters on Windfern Road, which had opened in 1978.
Berry Center of Northwest Houston
 Ken Pridgeon Stadium
 Carlton Center

See also

List of school districts in Texas

References

External links

Index of pages from original domain: cy-fair.isd.tenet.edu

 
School districts in Harris County, Texas
School districts in Houston
1939 establishments in Texas
School districts established in 1939